We Should Be Together may refer to:
 We Should Be Together (album), a 1979 album by Crystal Gayle
 We Should Be Together (Cliff Richard song)
 We Should Be Together (Don Williams song)
 We Should Be Together, a song by Pia Mia